Eugene Textile Center (ETC) is a studio and a regional source of fiber arts materials, equipment, and lessons in weaving, spinning, dyeing, and felting. Founded by Suzie Liles and Marilyn Robert in 2008 in Eugene, Oregon, USA, ETC offers classes and studio space for weaving and surface design, as well as meeting space for the Eugene Weavers' Guild. 

The Center also maintains a gallery showing rotating exhibits of fiber arts. The Arts and Business Alliance of Eugene, a project supported by the Oregon Arts Commission and the National Endowment for the Arts, described ETC in 2013 as "the only combination studio/retail outlet/educational center of its kind in the Pacific Northwest".

References

External links 

2008 establishments in Oregon
Companies based in Eugene, Oregon
Retail companies of the United States
Retail companies established in 2008